The 2015–16 Hannover 96 season is the 120th season in the club's football history. In 2015–16 the club plays in the Bundesliga, the premier tier of German football. It is the club's 14th consecutive season in this league after the promotion from the 2. Fußball-Bundesliga in 2002.

The season saw Hannover relegated to the 2. Bundesliga, the first time they will play outside of the Bundesliga since 2002.

Squad
As of 7 April 2016

Players out on loan

Transfers

Transferred in

Transferred out

Competitions

Bundesliga

League table

Results summary

Results by round

Matches

DFB-Pokal

Statistics

Goalscorers

Last updated: 14 May 2016

Clean sheets

Last updated: 14 May 2016

Disciplinary record

Last updated: 14 May 2016

References

Hannover 96
Hannover 96 seasons